Henningsvær Church is a parish church of the Church of Norway in Vågan Municipality in Nordland county, Norway. It is located in the fishing village of Henningsvær, located on some small islands immediately south of the large island of Austvågøya. It is the church for the Henningsvær parish which is part of the Lofoten prosti (deanery) in the Diocese of Sør-Hålogaland. The white, wooden church was built in a rectangular style in 1974 using plans drawn up by the architect Odd Storm. The church seats about 250 people.

History
Henningsvær Chapel was first built in Henningsvær in 1852. The church was on land donated by Jens Henrik Klæboe Dreyer in exchange for having his own chair in the new church. The old chapel was torn down in 1974 and a new church was built on the same site.

Media gallery

See also
List of churches in Sør-Hålogaland

References

Vågan
Churches in Nordland
Wooden churches in Norway
20th-century Church of Norway church buildings
Churches completed in 1974
1852 establishments in Norway
Rectangular churches in Norway